Craigia yunnanensis is a species of flowering plant in the family Malvaceae sensu lato or Tiliaceae. It is found in China and Vietnam. It is threatened by habitat loss.

References

yunnanensis
Flora of China
Flora of Vietnam
Flora of Yunnan
Endangered flora of Asia
Taxonomy articles created by Polbot